The Saint Joseph's Church is a Roman Catholic church in Sarajevo, Bosnia and Herzegovina. It was proclaimed a National Monument of Bosnia and Herzegovina in 2008.

The initial design of St. Joseph's church by Karel Pařík was based on the design for a neo-Romanesque church given to Archbishop Ivan Šarić by Pope Pius XI. Work began on the construction of church in 1936, and the building was consecrated on 31 March 1940.
In plan the church is a triple-aisled basilica with transept. Below the sanctuary is a crypt containing the tomb of Archbishop Ivan Šarić. There are a further fifteen tombs in the south, west and east walls of the church. The church was painted by Josip Podolski in 1939, and the original stained glass windows were designed by Ivan Marinkocić. The stained glass at the west end and in the apse was destroyed by an explosion in 1945, but later restored. The high altar of St. Joseph and the terracotta Stations of the Cross were a gift from Pope Pius XII. The sculptor Franjo Rebhan carved the side altars and the tombs in the crypts.
The church was damaged during the 1992–1995 war, after which it underwent structural repairs, with conservation and restoration work being carried out on the murals and stained glass.

References 

Sarajevo
Buildings and structures in Sarajevo
Roman Catholic churches completed in 1939
National Monuments of Bosnia and Herzegovina
Roman Catholic churches in Sarajevo
1939 establishments in Yugoslavia
20th-century Roman Catholic church buildings in Bosnia and Herzegovina